Tan Sri Datuk Tee Hock Seng,  (born 19 July 1949) is a Malaysian businessman and group managing director of the construction firm, Bina Puri. He is a former-appointed member of the senate of the Malaysian parliament and the past president of the Chinese Association Federation of Hokkien Association of Malaysia

Career
Tee started his career as a salesman at Chop Seng Lee selling Mobil Petroleum products. He left the firm in 1976 to join his brothers, Tay Hock Lee and Tee Hock Hin, in starting a construction-based company, ‘Pembinaan Tekun Jaya Sdn Bhd’. In 1983 he oversaw the merger of the company with Bina Puri Sdn Bhd. At Bina Puri, Tee began his career as a finance director and was appointed to the board on 5 November 1990. He was subsequently appointed as the group managing director. In January 1995, he was responsible for getting Bina Puri listed on the main board of the Kuala Lumpur Stock Exchange (KLSE).

The firm has completed numerous multi-million ringgit projects (valued in excess of US$2 billion), in Malaysia and overseas The group's business activities include investment holdings, property development and management, the manufacturing of construction materials, power generation, highway concessionaire, and hospitality.

Party affiliations
On 15 July 2008, Tee was an appointed a member of the Malaysian Senate (the Dewan Negara), for a term of three years. He served concurrently as treasurer-general of the Malaysian Chinese Association (MCA) from 2008 to 2010. Following the defeat of the MCA aligned president, Tan Sri Dato Seri Ong Tee Keat, in the party polls, Tee tendered his resignation on 30 March 2010.

Honours
 Malaysia's Construction Industry Development Board (CIDB) in 2005 the "Most Prominent Player" award.
 Lifetime achievement award at the 2nd Malaysia Golden Entrepreneur Awards.
 Atsumi Award at the 44th International Federation of Asian and Western Pacific Contractors’ Associations (IFAWPCA) in 2018.

Honours of Malaysia

Commander of the Order of Loyalty to the Crown of Malaysia (PSM) - Tan Sri (2000)

Commander of the Order of Kinabalu (PGDK) - Datuk (1991) 
Companion of the Order of Kinabalu (ASDK) - (1989)

Selangor's Justice of the Peace (JP) - (1991)

References

1949 births
Living people
People from Selangor
Malaysian people of Hokkien descent
Malaysian politicians of Chinese descent
Malaysian business executives
Malaysian Chinese Association politicians
Members of the Dewan Negara
Commanders of the Order of Kinabalu
Commanders of the Order of Loyalty to the Crown of Malaysia